Dischista cincta is a species of beetle from family Cetoniidae. It was described by Charles De Geer in 1778 and is endemic to South and East Africa, including Namibia.

References

Beetles described in 1778
Endemic fauna of Namibia
Beetles of Africa